Asclepias tomentosa, common name tuba milkweed, is a flowering plant in the milkweed family. It is indigenous to parts of Florida, Texas, and some southeastern states in the United States. It is a perennial dicot.

References

tomentosa
Plants described in 1817
Taxa named by Stephen Elliott